Ragnhild Myklebust, PLY is a Norwegian Nordic skier and multiple gold medal winner at the Paralympic Games. , she holds the record for the most ever medals won at the Winter Paralympics, having won 27 medals, of which 22 were gold.

Biography
Myklebust won five gold medals and one silver at the 1988 Winter Paralympics, two gold at the 1992 Games, five gold, two silver and two bronze in 1994, five gold in Nagano and five gold in 2002. She has won Paralympic medals in short, middle and long-distance cross-country races, relays, the biathlon, and ice sledge racing.

See also
Athletes with most gold medals in one event at the Paralympic Games

Notes

Living people
Norwegian female cross-country skiers
Paralympic cross-country skiers of Norway
Cross-country skiers at the 1988 Winter Paralympics
Cross-country skiers at the 1992 Winter Paralympics
Cross-country skiers at the 1994 Winter Paralympics
Cross-country skiers at the 1998 Winter Paralympics
Cross-country skiers at the 2002 Winter Paralympics
Paralympic ice sledge speed racers of Norway
Ice sledge speed racers at the 1988 Winter Paralympics
Ice sledge speed racers at the 1994 Winter Paralympics
Paralympic biathletes of Norway
Biathletes at the 1994 Winter Paralympics
Biathletes at the 1998 Winter Paralympics
Biathletes at the 2002 Winter Paralympics
Paralympic gold medalists for Norway
Paralympic silver medalists for Norway
Paralympic bronze medalists for Norway
Medalists at the 1988 Winter Paralympics
Medalists at the 1992 Winter Paralympics
Medalists at the 1994 Winter Paralympics
Medalists at the 1998 Winter Paralympics
Medalists at the 2002 Winter Paralympics
Norwegian female biathletes
Year of birth missing (living people)
Paralympic medalists in cross-country skiing
Paralympic medalists in biathlon